This is a list of Bangladeshi record labels.

C
 CD Choice

E
 Ektaar Music Ltd

G
 G-Series

S
 Soundtek

See also

Notes 

Bangladeshi record labels
Record
Record labels
Bangladesh